Sodium aluminium phosphate (SAlP) describes the inorganic compounds consisting of sodium salts of aluminium phosphates.  The most common SAlP has the formulas NaH14Al3(PO4)8·4H2O and Na3H15Al2(PO4)8. These materials are prepared by combining alumina, phosphoric acid, and sodium hydroxide.

In addition to the usual hydrate, an anhydrous SAlP is also known, Na3H15Al2(PO4)8
(CAS#10279-59-1), referred to as 8:2:3, reflecting the ratio of phosphate to aluminium to sodium.  Additionally an SAlP of ill-defined stoichiometry is used (NaxAly(PO4)z (CAS# 7785-88-8).

The acidic sodium aluminium phosphates are used as acids for baking powders for the chemical leavening of baked goods. Upon heating, SAlP combines with the baking soda to give carbon dioxide.  Most of its action occurs at baking temperatures, rather than when the dough or batter is mixed at room temperature.  SAlPs are advantageous because they impart a neutral flavor.  

As a food additive, it has the E number E541.  Basic sodium aluminium phosphates are also known, e.g., Na15Al3(PO4)8.  These species are useful in cheese making.

References

Sodium compounds
Aluminium compounds
Phosphates
E-number additives